Unsolicited goods are, in British law, goods delivered to an individual with a view to the individual acquiring them, but where the individual has no reasonable cause to believe that they were delivered for legitimate business and had not previously agreed to acquire them. These were regulated under the Unsolicited Goods Act 1971 but the Consumer Protection (Distance Selling) Regulations 2000 are stricter in every respect rendering the 1971 Act largely redundant from a consumer law perspective, although there is no express repeal. However the said distance selling regulations only apply to consumers so a business receiving the goods on an unsolicited basis would need to look at the 1971 Act. Also with effect from 14 June 2014 the distance regulations are replaced by The Consumer Contracts (Information, Cancellation and Additional Charges) Regulations 2013 which include a new s 29A added to the Consumer Protection from Unfair Trading Regulations 2008 making it clear the consumer may keep unsolicited goods. The 2008 regulations prohibit as a criminal offence various unfair advertising and marketing practices and in paragraph 29 of Schedule 1 make it a criminal offence to engage in  "Demanding immediate or deferred payment for or the return or safekeeping of products supplied by the trader, but not solicited by the consumer, except where the product is a substitute supplied in accordance with regulation 19(7) of the Consumer Protection (Distance Selling) Regulations 2000 (inertia selling)".

Rights of the recipient
The "recipient may [...] use, deal with, or dispose of the goods as if they were an unconditional gift to him" and "[t]he rights of the sender to the goods are extinguished".

Criminal liability of the sender
Under the Consumer Protection Regulations 2000 it is a criminal offence to:
 Assert a right of payment for the goods.
 Threaten to take legal action with regard to the goods.
 Threaten to place the recipient's name on a 'black-list'.
 Invoke or threaten to invoke any collection procedure.

This is important as if the individual is not aware that they have legal title to the goods, they may unjustly enrich the sender. The penalty is a fine up to Level 5 on the standard scale, except the first offence which is measured up to Level 4 on the standard scale

Under regulation 39 of The Consumer Contracts (Information, Cancellation and
Additional Charges) Regulations 2013 from 13 January 2014 the following section is included in the 2008 regulations mentioned above

This replaces the provision in the 2000 distance regulations with effect from 13 June 2014. Regulation 40 deals with additional payments demanded under a contract and regulation 41 deals with where a helpline charges over the basic rate (another form of unsolicited supply).

See also
 The Consumer Contracts (Information, Cancellation and Additional Charges) Regulations 2013
 The Consumer Protection from Unfair Trading Regulations 2008
 Consumer Protection (Distance Selling) Regulations 2000

External links
 The Consumer Protection (Distance Selling) Regulations 2000 (full text)

References

Contract law
English criminal law
1971 in British law
2000 in British law